WXPX-TV (channel 66) is a television station licensed to Bradenton, Florida, United States, broadcasting the Ion Television network to the Tampa Bay area. It is owned and operated by the Ion Media subsidiary of the E. W. Scripps Company alongside Tampa-licensed ABC affiliate WFTS-TV (channel 28). WXPX-TV's studios are located on 66th Street North in Clearwater, and its transmitter is located in Riverview, Florida.

History
The station first signed on the air on August 1, 1994 as WFCT; the station was founded by Paxson Communications, which was renamed Ion Media Networks in 2007. It originally ran an all-infomercial format as an affiliate of the Paxson-owned Infomall TV Network (inTV), and also carried programming from The Worship Network during the overnight hours. The station also broadcast games from the now-defunct Atlanta Knights minor league hockey franchise, which was affiliated with the NHL's Tampa Bay Lightning. At the time, Paxson also owned a chain of radio stations in Florida. Paxson's Tampa Bay radio cluster regularly received commercial time on WFCT; this ended when Paxson sold off his radio and billboard businesses to fund start up operations for the Pax TV network.

The station changed its call letters to WXPX-TV in 1998; the station then became a charter owned-and-operated station of Pax TV (which rebranded as i: Independent Television on July 1, 2005 and later to Ion on January 29, 2007) when it debuted on August 31 of that year, after which it rebranded as "Pax 66". The Worship Network and infomercial remained on the station's schedule but it also carried the network's family-oriented programming.

From 2004 to 2008, WXPX became the over-the-air broadcaster of the Tampa Bay Devil Rays Major League Baseball franchise, airing a number of games that were not televised on a national broadcast or cable network. It also carried NBA games from the Orlando Magic through the syndicated Magic Television Network. The rights to those games later exclusively moved to regional sports networks Fox Sports Florida and Sun Sports.

Sale to Scripps
On September 24, 2020, the Cincinnati-based E. W. Scripps Company announced that it would purchase Ion Media for $2.65 billion, with financing from Berkshire Hathaway. With this purchase, Scripps will divest 23 Ion-owned stations, but no announcement has been made as to which stations that Scripps will divest as part of the move. The proposed divestitures will allow the merged company to fully comply with the FCC local and national ownership regulations. Scripps has agreed to a transaction with an unnamed buyer, who has agreed to maintain Ion affiliations for the stations. Scripps decided to keep WXPX-TV, making it a sister station to ABC affiliate WFTS-TV (channel 28).

Newscasts and local programming
In 2000, WXPX entered into a news share agreement with NBC affiliate WFLA-TV (channel 8) as a result of NBC's management agreement with Pax TV. Unlike other Pax stations that rebroadcast newscasts seen on the originating station on a half-hour delay at minimum, the WFLA newscasts aired on WXPX were initially broadcast live and produced specifically for the station; the newscasts, titled News Channel 8 on PAX, aired weeknights at 7 and 10 p.m. (the latter competed with Fox owned-and-operated station WTVT channel 13's longer-established in-house prime time newscast).

Due to poor ratings of the live newscasts, in 2002, the newscasts switched to pre-recorded broadcasts of WFLA's 6 and 11 p.m. newscasts airing at 7 and 11:30 p.m. (WFLA attempted another 10 p.m. newscast five years later for WTTA, channel 38, in October 2007, which ran until its 2009 cancellation; WFLA launched its own 7 p.m. newscast in 2012). The WFLA agreement ended on June 30, 2005, when Paxson dissolved news share agreements on all of its stations (which, with a few exceptions, mainly involved NBC owned-and-operated stations and affiliates, such as WFLA).

The only local non-brokered programming currently seen on WXPX is a local public affairs program i on Tampa; the station also previously aired Miccosukee Magazine (which also aired on sister stations WPXM-TV in Miami, WPXP-TV in West Palm Beach and WOPX-TV in Orlando).

Technical information

Subchannels 
The station's digital signal is multiplexed:

Analog-to-digital conversion 
WXPX-TV shut down its analog signal, over UHF channel 66, on June 12, 2009, as part of the federally mandated transition from analog to digital television. The station's digital signal remained on its pre-transition UHF channel 42, using PSIP to display WXPX-TV's virtual channel as 66 on digital television receivers, which was among the high band UHF channels (52–69) that were removed from broadcasting use as a result of the transition.

References

External links

Ion Television affiliates
Court TV affiliates
Grit (TV network) affiliates
Laff (TV network) affiliates
Defy TV affiliates
TrueReal affiliates
Scripps News affiliates
E. W. Scripps Company television stations
Television channels and stations established in 1994
XPX-TV
1994 establishments in Florida